Hadley is a both a surname and a given name that is a transferred use of a place name of English origin that means “heather field.” The name has increased in popularity in recent years for girls in the United States and has ranked among the top 200 names used for American girls since 2011. Spelling variants such as Hadlee and Hadleigh are also in wide use.

Notable people with the name include:

Surname:
 Arthur Twining Hadley (1856–1930), American economist
 Arthur Hadley (footballer) (1876–1963), English footballer
 Bert Hadley (1882–1968), American actor
 David Hadley (born 1964), American businessman and former politician
 Della Hadley (born 1929), American politician
 George Hadley, meteorologist
 George Hadley (footballer) (1893–1963), half-back for Southampton, Aston Villa, and Coventry City
 Hap Hadley (1895-1976), American artist
 Harry Hadley (1877–1942), England international footballer
 Henry Hadley (died 1914), "first British casualty" of World War I
 Henry Kimball Hadley, US composer
 Herbert S. Hadley (1872–1927), Governor of Missouri
 Jackson Hadley, American businessman and politician
 Jerry Hadley (1952–2007), American opera tenor
 John Hadley (1682–1744), astronomer and inventor of the octant
 John Hadley (chemist) (1731–1764), cooperated with Benjamin Franklin on latent heat experiments
 John Hadley (philosopher) (born 1966), Australian philosopher
 John V. Hadley (c. 1839–1842–1915), Justice of the Indiana Supreme Court
 Joshua Hadley, Republic of Texas politician
 Patrick Hadley, British composer
 Ray Hadley, Australian radio broadcaster
 Stephen Hadley, United States National Security Advisor
 Thomas Jefferson Hadley, American Revolutionary war captain
 Tony Hadley, British pop singer and lead voice of Spandau Ballet during the 1980s
 William M. Hadley, American educator

Given name:
 Hadley Fraser, British theatre actor
 Hadley Freeman, UK fashion journalist
 Hadley Richardson, first wife of Ernest Hemingway, grandmother to Margaux and Mariel Hemingway
 Hadley Wickham, data scientist and software developer

Fictional characters:
 Remy "Thirteen" Hadley, character in the TV series House

English-language surnames
English toponymic surnames